MCRA may refer to:

 Marine Corps Reserve Association
 McrA RNA motif
 Medical Care Recovery Act
 Mendip Cave Registry and Archive
 Mineralocorticoid receptor antagonist